Outi Marjatta Ojala (28 June 1946, Lappee – 16 May 2017) was a Finnish politician of the Left Alliance. She served as a member of the Parliament of Finland from 1991 to 1996 and from 1999 to 2007, and as a Member of the European Parliament from 1996 to 1999. She was President of the Nordic Council in 2002.

Ojala trained as a nurse and was involved in trade unions and local politics in Helsinki, where she was a city councillor 1989–1996 and 2001–2012.

Positions
Chairperson of the National Advisory Board on Romani Affairs 1996–2001

References

1946 births
2017 deaths
People from Lappeenranta
Finnish People's Democratic League politicians
Left Alliance (Finland) politicians
Members of the Parliament of Finland (1991–95)
Members of the Parliament of Finland (1995–99)
Members of the Parliament of Finland (1999–2003)
Members of the Parliament of Finland (2003–07)
Left Alliance (Finland) MEPs
20th-century women MEPs for Finland
MEPs for Denmark 1994–1999
Women local politicians
Women members of the Parliament of Finland
21st-century Finnish women politicians